Chrystine is a feminine given name. Notable people with the name include:

 Chrystine Brouillet (born 1958), Canadian novelist
 Chrystine Tauber, American equestrian

See also
 Christine (name)
 Christina (given name)

Feminine given names